Torino were declared 1948–49 Serie A champions on 6 May 1949, after the Superga tragedy, an air disaster that killed the entire Torino squad. At the time of the declaration, Torino led the runner-up Internazionale by four points with four matches remaining. Their remaining four matches were played by their reserve team, and they finished the league five points ahead of the runner up.

Teams
Novara for Northern Italy, Padova for Central Italy and Palermo for Southern Italy had been promoted from Serie B.

Events
Following the restoration of ordinary Serie B championship, the FIGC decided to come back to two relegations only from Serie A.

Final classification

Note: Goal Difference did not come into effect until the 1960s.

Results

Top goalscorers

References and sources
Almanacco Illustrato del Calcio - La Storia 1898-2004, Panini Edizioni, Modena, September 2005

Footnotes

External links
  - All results on RSSSF Website.

Serie A seasons
Italy
1948–49 in Italian football leagues